This article is about the particular significance of the year 1732 to Wales and its people.

Incumbents
Lord Lieutenant of North Wales (Lord Lieutenant of Anglesey, Caernarvonshire, Denbighshire, Flintshire, Merionethshire, Montgomeryshire) – George Cholmondeley, 2nd Earl of Cholmondeley 
Lord Lieutenant of Glamorgan – Charles Powlett, 3rd Duke of Bolton
Lord Lieutenant of Brecknockshire and Lord Lieutenant of Monmouthshire – Thomas Morgan
Lord Lieutenant of Cardiganshire – John Vaughan, 2nd Viscount Lisburne
Lord Lieutenant of Carmarthenshire – – vacant until 1755
Lord Lieutenant of Pembrokeshire – Sir Arthur Owen, 3rd Baronet
Lord Lieutenant of Radnorshire – James Brydges, 1st Duke of Chandos

Bishop of Bangor – Thomas Sherlock
Bishop of Llandaff – John Harris 
Bishop of St Asaph – Thomas Tanner (from 23 January)
Bishop of St Davids – Nicholas Clagett (from 23 January)

Events
23 January - Thomas Tanner becomes Bishop of St Asaph.
1 July - Charles Hanbury Williams marries Frances, the daughter of earl Coningsby.
John Wynne buys the Soughton Hall estate in Northop, Flintshire.
A mineral spring is discovered at Llanwrtyd Wells by the Rev. Theophilus Evans.
"Madam" Bridget Bevan begins her correspondence with Griffith Jones (Llanddowror). 
Artist Edward Owen is robbed and beaten in London, receiving serious injuries that contribute to his death some years later.
Frederick, Prince of Wales, purchases Carlton House in London as his new home.
Howell Harris becomes a schoolmaster at Llangors.
Bishop John Wynne purchases the Northop estate in Flintshire.

Arts and literature

New books
David Evans - A Help for parents and Heads of families … by David Evans, a Labourer in the Gospel at Tredyffren in Pennsylvania (published in Philadelphia by B. Franklin)
Jeremy Owen - Golwg ar y Beiau sydd yn yr Hanes a Brintiwyd ynghylch Pedair i Bump Mlynedd i nawr, ym mherthynas i'r Rhwygiad a wnaethpwyd yn Eglwys Henllan yny Blynyddoedd 1707, 1708, 1709
David Rees - Adnodau or rai Lleoedd Cableddus a Sarhaus o Lyfrau … ar Fedydd Plant

Births
5 October - Lloyd Kenyon, 1st Baron Kenyon, lawyer and politician (died 1802)
date unknown - Stafford Prys, bookseller and printer (died 1784)

Deaths
April - Lady Pryce of Newtown Hall, second wife of Sir John Pryce , 5th baronet
4 December - William Baker, former Bishop of Bangor, 64
16 December - William Bradshaw, Bishop of Bristol, 61

References

1732 by country
1733 in Great Britain